EDSA station is an elevated Manila Light Rail Transit (LRT) station situated on Line 1. The station is located on the intersection of Taft Avenue and Epifanio de los Santos Avenue, or EDSA, one of Metro Manila's major thoroughfares. The station was named after EDSA, which in turn is named after Epifanio de los Santos, a noted historian.

The station is the second station for trains headed to Roosevelt, the nineteenth station for trains headed to Baclaran, and is one of the four Line 1 stations serving Pasay, the others are Gil Puyat, Libertad and Baclaran.

Transportation links
The station is served by an abundance of buses, jeepneys, and taxis on both EDSA and Taft Avenue routes, with stops near the station. Many provincial bus lines, such as Victory Liner (serving Northern Luzon) and Philtranco (serving Southern Luzon and the rest of the Philippines), have bus terminals near the station. Buses and jeepneys from this station ply for various points in Metro Manila, like Pasay, Muntinlupa (Sucat and Alabang), Taguig and Parañaque cities (Bicutan), SM Mall of Asia, Las Piñas, City of Manila, Quezon City, Caloocan, and Makati and the southern provinces of Cavite, Batangas, and Laguna.

The station is also the transfer point for commuters riding the Manila Metro Rail Transit System Line 3. The station is connected to MRT-3's Taft Avenue station by a walkway around the exterior of the Metro Point Mall, with two entrances to the mall itself.

Expansion
The expansion works began on June 26, 2019, and is expected to be finished on 2022. However, the upgrade was finished earlier than expected in anticipation for the Cavite Extension Project on October 21, 2019. The project consists of the expansion of the structure through the third floor of the adjacent Lianas/Mayson department store, and constructing a bridge to connect nearby areas.

The expansion also features a new roofing system, a widened floor area by dismantling the old ticket booths in order to widen the space  of the station, an increased floor-to-ceiling height in other areas of the station, and the construction of a new fire exit for the southeast leg of the station. The expansion also features new comfort rooms, a Person With Disability (PWD) ramp, LED lighting setups, interior paint jobs, and floor finishes.

See also
List of rail transit stations in Metro Manila
Manila Light Rail Transit System

References

Manila Light Rail Transit System stations
Railway stations opened in 1984
Buildings and structures in Pasay